Attorney General Kelly may refer to:

Basil Kelly (1920–2008), Attorney General for Northern Ireland
Fitzroy Kelly (1796–1880), Attorney General for England and Wales
Francis E. Kelly (1903–1982), Attorney General of Massachusetts
John M. Kelly (politician) (1931–1991), Attorney General of Ireland
Linda L. Kelly (born 1949), Attorney General of Pennsylvania

See also
Frank J. Kelley (born 1924), Attorney General of Michigan
General Kelly (disambiguation)